Mark Peterson may refer to:

 Mark Peterson (soccer) (1960–2011), American soccer forward
 Mark Peterson (district attorney) (born 1958), American politician
 Mark Peterson (photographer) (born 1955), American photographer

See also
 Mark Petersen (disambiguation)